Wausau Paper (NYSE: WPP) (stylized as wausauPAPER) is an American pulp and paper company. It has approximately 870 employees as of December 2014, has manufacturing operations in Harrodsburg, Kentucky and Middletown, Ohio, and a support services facility in Mosinee, Wisconsin. On January 21, 2016, Wausau Paper was acquired by SCA Tissue North America for $513 million. The stock was removed from NYSE on the same day.

Wausau Paper Corp. (Wausau Paper) incorporated on June 9, 1899, and manufactures, converts, and sells paper and paper products. As of May 9, 2014, the company had two operating facilities and a services center located in three states. The company operates a single principal business in the away-from-home towel and tissue segment of the paper industry. The company produces a line of towel and tissue products that are marketed, along with soap and dispensing systems, for the away-from-home market.

References

External links
 Company website
 Wausau Paper Corp EDGER Filing History

Manufacturing companies established in 1899
Companies listed on the New York Stock Exchange
Manufacturing companies based in Wisconsin
Pulp and paper companies of the United States
Papermaking in the United States
History of Wisconsin
1899 establishments in Wisconsin